Gene Michael Grossman (born December 11, 1955, in New York) is the Jacob Viner Professor of International Economics at Princeton University. He received his B.A. in Economics from Yale University in 1976 and his Ph.D. in Economics from the Massachusetts Institute of Technology in 1980. He became assistant professor at Princeton University in 1980 and full professor of economics in 1988. He is well known for his research on international trade, in large part focusing on the relationship between economic growth and trade and the political economy of trade policy. He is also known for his work on the environmental Kuznets curve. He frequently collaborated with Harvard professor Elhanan Helpman, producing three books together: Innovation and Growth in the Global Economy, Special Interest Politics, and Interest Groups and Trade Policy. In 2009, Grossman received an honorary doctorate in Economics from the University of St. Gallen. Grossman received the 2015 Onassis Prize for International Trade. In 2016, Grossman received an honorary doctorate in Economics from the University of Minho. Professor Grossman currently lives with his wife and fellow lecturer at the Princeton School of Public and International Affairs, Jean Baldwin Grossman. He has two children.

Grossman was elected as a member of the American Academy of Arts and Sciences in 1997.

Publications

References

External links
 Gene Grossman's personal homepage at Princeton University
 Gene Grossman at IDEAS/RePEc

1955 births
21st-century American economists
Living people
International economists
Fellows of the Econometric Society
Yale University alumni
MIT School of Humanities, Arts, and Social Sciences alumni
Princeton University faculty
Trade economists
Environmental economists
Fellows of the American Academy of Arts and Sciences
Sloan Research Fellows
American economics writers
The Bronx High School of Science alumni